= Satik Seyranyan =

Armenian journalist

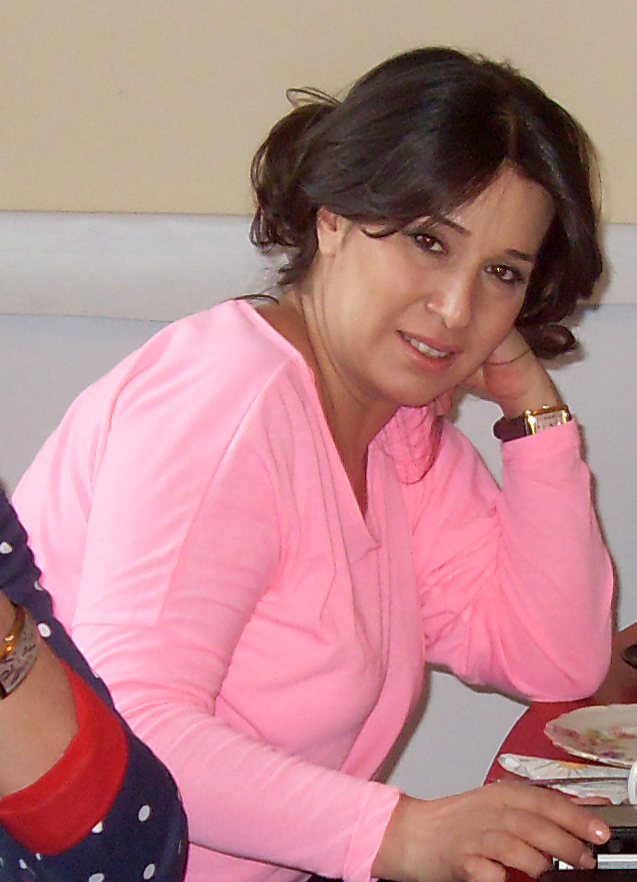
- Born: 20 February 1974 (age 51); Yerevan, Armenia
- Occupation: Journalist
- Known for: President of the Union of Journalists of Armenia

Satik Seyranyan (born 20 February 1974 in Yerevan) is an Armenian journalist who has served as the president of the Union of Journalists of Armenia since 2017.
